Holger Zastrow (born 12 January 1969 in Dresden) is a German politician of the liberal Free Democratic Party of Germany (FDP). He is President of state party in Saxony (since 1999) and chairman of the FDP parliamentary group in the Saxon Parliament (since 2004). He is also a member of the federal board of the FDP.

After the formation of a CDU-FDP coalition government in Saxony in 2009, he decided against taking the position as Deputy Prime Minister, choosing to remain chair of the parliamentary group.

References 

1969 births
Living people
Members of the Landtag of Saxony
Free Democratic Party (Germany) politicians
Politicians from Dresden